Diffusion is a time-dependent random process causing a spread in space.

Diffusion may also refer to:

Physical sciences
 Molecular diffusion, spontaneous dispersion of mass (distinct from migration, caused by an external force)
 Conduction of heat
 Momentum diffusion
 Diffusion equation
 Heat equation
 Eddy diffusion

More specific meanings 
 Anomalous diffusion, the movement of particles from a region of lower concentration to a region of higher concentration
 Diffusion MRI
 Diffusion (acoustics), sound waves
 Atomic diffusion
 Brownian motion
 Collective diffusion
 Facilitated diffusion
 Effusion of a gas through small holes
 Gaseous diffusion
 Itō diffusion
 Knudsen diffusion of particles from very small containers
 Osmosis, the movement of molecules through a membrane
 Reverse osmosis, a process to separate unwanted particles from a fluid
 Photon diffusion, an optical effect
 Diffuse reflection, the reflection of light from an uneven or granular surface
 Reverse diffusion, the movement of particles from a region of lower concentration to a region of higher concentration
 Rotational diffusion
 Self-diffusion
 Surface diffusion
 Thermodiffusion

Social sciences
 Diffusion of innovations within a society or a culture or between them
 Lexical diffusion within a culture
 Trans-cultural diffusion of culture items between cultures

Technology 
 Diffusion (cryptography), the spreading of influence of bits in a cipher
 Error diffusion in image processing
 Diffusion model in machine learning image generation.

Other uses
 Diffusion (business), the process by which a new idea or new product is accepted by the market
 Diffusion line, a secondary line of merchandise created by a high-end fashion designer
 Diffusion Pharmaceuticals, a drug development company
 Diffusion process, in probability theory the solution to a stochastic differential equation
 Diffusion of responsibility
 Society for the Diffusion of Useful Knowledge
 Diffusion Science Radio Show, a science radio show and podcast on 2SER in Sydney
 Diffusion Records, an independent record label
 Sound diffusion, a performance practice in electronic music

See also
 Diffuser (disambiguation)
 Diffuse nebula
 Migration (disambiguation)